McHale is a surname of Irish origin. It refers to:
Persons
Brian McHale (b. 1952), American literary theorist and author
Brian K. McHale (b. 1954), American politician from Maryland
Christina McHale (b. 1992), American tennis player
D. J. MacHale (b. 1956), US-American writer, director, and executive producer
Des MacHale (b. 1950), associate professor of Mathematics at University College Cork, Ireland
Evelyn McHale (1923–1947), American bookkeeper, subject of an iconic photograph showing her body after she jumped from an observation platform of the Empire State Building
Gary McHale (contemporary), Canadian protest organizer
James McHale, Western Australian journalist
Jim McHale (1875–1959), American professional baseball player
Jock McHale (1882–1953), Australian rules football player and coach
Joe McHale (b. 1963), American football linebacker 
Joel McHale (b. 1971), American television show host, comedian, and actor
John MacHale (1791–1891), Irish Roman Catholic archbishop and Irish nationalist
John McHale (1922–1978), Scottish-American artist
John McHale (1921–2008), American professional baseball player and manager
Judith McHale, American executive
Kevin McHale (b. 1939), English professional football player
Kevin McHale (b. 1957), American professional basketball player
Kevin Michael McHale (b. 1988), American actor and singer
Marty McHale (1886–1979), American professional baseball player
Patrick McHale (1826–1866), Irish recipient of the Victoria Cross
Paul McHale (b. 1981), Scottish professional football player
Paul F. McHale, Jr. (b. 1950), American politician from Pennsylvania
Ray McHale (b. 1950), English professional football player
Sheila McHale (contemporary), English-Australian politician from Western Australia
Tom McHale (b. 1902), American novelist from Iowa
Tom McHale (1941–1983), American novelist from Pennsylvania
Tom McHale (1963–2008), American professional football player
Tommy McHale, English professional footballer
Tony McHale (contemporary), British actor, writer, and director

Fictional Characters
Lieutenant Commander Quinton McHale, title character of the American television series McHale's Navy